Lansdowne   is a community in the Canadian province of Nova Scotia, located in  Pictou County . The community is named after Henry Petty-Fitzmaurice, 5th Marquess of Lansdowne.

Navigator

References

Lansdowne on Destination Nova Scotia

Communities in Pictou County